{{DISPLAYTITLE:C8H6O2}}
The molecular formula C8H6O2 (molar mass: 134.13 g/mol, exact mass: 134.0368 u) may refer to:

 1,4-Benzodioxine
 Phenylglyoxal
 Phthalaldehyde
 Phthalide

Molecular formulas